Leon Fleisher (July 23, 1928 – August 2, 2020) was an American classical pianist, conductor and pedagogue. He was one of the most renowned pianists and pedagogues in the world. Music correspondent Elijah Ho called him "one of the most refined and transcendent musicians the United States has ever produced".

Born in San Francisco, Fleisher began playing piano at the age of four, and began studying with Artur Schnabel at age nine. He was particularly well known for his interpretations of the two piano concertos of Brahms and the five concertos of Beethoven, which he recorded with George Szell and the Cleveland Orchestra. With Szell, he also recorded concertos by Mozart, Grieg, Schumann, Franck, and Rachmaninoff.

In 1964, he lost the use of his right hand due to a neurological condition eventually diagnosed as focal dystonia, forcing him to focus on the repertoire for the left hand, such as Ravel's Piano Concerto for the Left Hand and many compositions written for him. In 2004, he played the world premiere of Paul Hindemith's Klaviermusik, a piano concerto for the left hand completed in 1923, with the Berlin Philharmonic. He regained some control of his right hand then, and played and recorded two-hand repertoire.

He was also notable as a conductor, and especially as a teacher for over 60 years at the Peabody Institute at Johns Hopkins University, the Curtis Institute of Music and others. He was a Kennedy Center Honors awardee in 2007, among many distinctions.

Early life and studies 
Fleisher was born on July 23, 1928, in San Francisco, the son of Bertha and Isidor Fleisher. His parents were Jewish immigrants, his father from Odessa and his mother from Poland. His family was poor. His father's business was hat-making, while his mother's goal was to make her son a great concert pianist. Fleisher started studying the piano at age four. He made his public debut at age eight. At age nine, he became one of the few child prodigies to be accepted for study with the renowned Austrian teacher Artur Schnabel, who taught him in a tradition that descended directly from Beethoven through Carl Czerny and Theodor Leschetizky. He also studied with Maria Curcio and Karl Ulrich Schnabel. Fleisher played at Carnegie Hall with the New York Philharmonic under Pierre Monteux at age 16, and Monteux called him "the pianistic find of the century."

Performer and recording artist 
In the 1950s, Fleisher signed an exclusive recording contract with Columbia Masterworks. He was particularly well known for his interpretations of the piano concerti of Brahms and Beethoven, which he recorded with George Szell and the Cleveland Orchestra. They also recorded Mozart's Piano Concerto No. 25, the Grieg and Schumann piano concertos, Franck's Symphonic Variations, and Rachmaninoff's Rhapsody on a Theme of Paganini.

When he was 24, Fleisher became the first American to win a prestigious piano competition established by Queen Elisabeth of Belgium, which helped to catapult his career. In 1964, at the age of 36, Fleisher lost the use of his right hand, due to a neurological condition that was eventually diagnosed as focal dystonia. In 1967, Fleisher commenced performing and recording the left-handed repertoire while searching for a cure for his condition. His first choice was Ravel's Piano Concerto for the Left Hand. In addition, he undertook conducting beginning in 1968, and became associate conductor of the Baltimore Symphony Orchestra in 1973, and music director of the Annapolis Symphony Orchestra. In the 1990s, Fleisher was able to ameliorate his focal dystonia symptoms after experimental botox injections to the point where he could play with both hands again.

In 2004, Vanguard Classics released Fleisher's first "two-handed" recording since the 1960s, titled Two Hands, to critical acclaim. Two Hands is also the title of a short documentary on Fleisher by Nathaniel Kahn, which was nominated for an Academy Award for best short subject on January 23, 2007. Fleisher received the 2007 Kennedy Center Honors. Kennedy Center Chairman Stephen A. Schwarzman described him as "a consummate musician whose career is a moving testament to the life-affirming power of art."

Fleisher's musical interests extended beyond the central German Classic-Romantic repertoire. The American composer William Bolcom composed his Concerto for Two Pianos, Left Hand for Fleisher and his close friend Gary Graffman, who has also suffered from debilitating problems with his right hand. It received its first performance in Baltimore in April 1996. The concerto is so constructed that it can be performed in one of three ways, with either piano part alone with reduced orchestra, or with both piano parts and the two reduced orchestras combined into a full orchestra. Composers who wrote music for him also included Lukas Foss, Leon Kirchner and Gunther Schuller.

In 2004, Fleisher played the world premiere of Paul Hindemith's Klaviermusik (Piano Concerto for the Left Hand), Op. 29, with the Berlin Philharmonic conducted by Simon Rattle. This work was written in 1923, for Paul Wittgenstein, who disliked and refused to play it. However, he had sole performing rights and kept the score, not allowing any other pianists to play it. The manuscript was discovered among his papers after the death of his widow in 2002. On October 2, 2005, Fleisher played the American premiere of the work, with the San Francisco Symphony under Herbert Blomstedt. In 2012, at the invitation of Justice Ruth Bader Ginsburg, Fleisher performed at the Supreme Court of the United States.

He continued to be involved in music, both conducting and teaching for more than 60 years at the Peabody Institute of the Johns Hopkins University, the Curtis Institute of Music, and the Royal Conservatory of Music in Toronto; he was also closely associated with the Tanglewood Music Center. With Dina Koston, he co-founded and co-directed the Theater Chamber Players in 1968–2003, which was the first resident chamber ensemble of the Smithsonian Institution and of the Pedagogy. His students include Frank Lévy, André Watts, Yefim Bronfman, Hélène Grimaud, Louis Lortie, Dina Koston, Jonathan Biss, Nicholas Angelich, and Joel Fan.

His memoir, My Nine Lives, co-written with the Washington Post music critic Anne Midgette, came out in November 2010.

Death
Fleisher died in Baltimore, Maryland, on August 2, 2020, at age 92.

Awards and recognition 

 1952: Gold medal of the Queen Elisabeth Music Competition
 1992: Fellow of the American Academy of Arts and Sciences
 1994: Instrumentalist of the Year, by Musical America
 President's Medal of the Johns Hopkins University
 2006: Commander in the Order of Arts and Letters by the Minister of Culture of the French government
 2007: Kennedy Center Honors
 2010: Instrumentalist of the Year, by the Royal Philharmonic Society

Honorary doctorates
 Towson State University
 Boston Conservatory
 University of Cincinnati
 Cleveland Institute of Music
 San Francisco Conservatory of Music
 St. Olaf College
 Amherst College
 Juilliard School of Music
 Peabody Institute of the Johns Hopkins University

Discography 
 Leon Fleisher: The Complete Album Collection, Sony Classical Records, 2013
 Mozart: Piano Concertos, including 2008 recordings of the Piano Concertos in A major, K. 414 and K 488, with Fleisher soloist and as conductor of the Stuttgart Chamber Orchestra, and of the concerto K. 242 with Katherine Jacobson Fleisher (his wife) as second pianist. Sony BMG Masterworks, 2009
 Schubert: Sonata in B-flat major, D.960 / Ländler (original LP release 1956), Sony BMG Masterworks, 2008 (digital re-release)
 Debussy: Suite bergamasque / Ravel: Sonatine / Valses nobles et sentimentales / Alborado del gracioso (original LP release 1959), Sony BMG Masterworks, 2008 (digital re-release)
 Mozart: Sonata in C major, K.330 / Sonata in E-flat major, K.282 / Rondo in D Major, K.485 (original LP release 1960), Sony BMG Masterworks, 2008 (digital re-release)
 Liszt: Sonata in B minor / Weber: Sonata No. 4 in E minor, Op. 70 / Invitation to the Dance, Op. 65 (original LP release 1960), Sony BMG Masterworks, 2008 (digital re-release)
 Copland: Piano Sonata / Sessions: From My Diary / Kirchner: Piano Sonata/Rorem: Three Barcarolles (original LP release 1963), Sony BMG Masterworks, 2008 (digital re-release)
 Brahms: Quintet for Piano and Strings in F minor, Op. 34 (original LP release 1963), with the Juilliard String Quartet Sony BMG Masterworks, 2008 (digital re-release)
 Brahms: Quintet for Piano and Strings in F minor, Op. 34, recorded 2007 with the Emerson String Quartet for Deutsche Grammophon
 The Essential Leon Fleisher, Sony BMG Masterworks, 2008
 The Journey, Vanguard Classics, 2006
 Leon Fleisher: Two Hands, (including a 2004 recording of Schubert: Sonata  in B-Flat Major, D.960), Vanguard Classics, 2004
 Schumann: Piano Concerto and Grieg: Piano Concerto with the Cleveland Orchestra and Szell (original recordings 1960, remastered and reissued 2004 by Sony BMG)
 Beethoven: The Five Piano Concertos, with the Cleveland Orchestra led by George Szell (original recordings 1959–61, remastered), Sony BMG Masterworks, reissued 1990 and in new remastering 2006
 Brahms: Piano Concertos Nos. 1 (rec. 1958) and 2 (rec. 1962), with the Cleveland Orchestra led by George Szell; Handel Variations and Waltzes, op. 39  (rec. 1956); Sony Masterworks, remastered and reissued 1997
 Leon Fleisher Recital, Sony Classical, 1993
 Ravel, Prokofiev, Britten: Piano Works for the Left Hand, Sony Classical, 1993
 Mozart Piano Concerto No. 25,  with the Cleveland Orchestra led by George Szell Sony Classical, reissued 1990

References

External links 

 
 
 
 
 Bruce Duffie: Pianist/Conductor/Teacher Leon Fleisher (interview) March 6, 1995
 

1928 births
2020 deaths
20th-century American conductors (music)
20th-century American male musicians
21st-century American conductors (music)
21st-century American male musicians
American classical pianists
American male classical pianists
American male conductors (music)
American music educators
American people of Polish-Jewish descent
American people with disabilities
Classical pianists who played with one arm
Deaths from cancer in Maryland
Fellows of the American Academy of Arts and Sciences
Fellows of the Royal Conservatory of Music
Jewish American classical musicians
Jewish classical pianists
Kennedy Center honorees
Musicians from San Francisco
Peabody Institute faculty
Pianists from San Francisco
Piano pedagogues
Prize-winners of the Queen Elisabeth Competition
Pupils of Artur Schnabel
Pupils of Maria Curcio
Academic staff of The Royal Conservatory of Music
21st-century American Jews